Srinivasan Ramakrishnan is a condensed matter physicist working on experimental ultra-low temperature research. He was the director and distinguished professor of the Tata Institute of Fundamental Research (TIFR). Recently, he joined IISER Pune as a distinguished professor.

Education 

Srinivasan Ramakrishnan, did his B.Sc. degree in Applied Sciences from the PSG College of Technology at Coimbatore in 1977 and M.Sc. Physics in IIT Madras in 1979. He joined Tata Institute of Fundamental Research in 1979, enrolled at the University of Mumbai for doctoral studies on superconductivity in transition metal compounds and obtained his Ph.D. in 1985.

Research 
His efforts in Ultra Low Temperature (ULT) research led to the discovery of superconductivity in the Bismuth at 0.53 mK and was published in Science 2017. Temperature of the experiments in his laboratory range from 400 K to 40 μK.

Awards 
He is a recipient of the Friedrich Bessel research award (bestowed by Alexander von Humboldt Foundation) in November 2001. He was elected as a fellow of the Indian Academy of Sciences in 2002.

References 

21st-century Indian physicists
Indian condensed matter physicists
1956 births
Living people